William Harold Scherr (born July 27, 1961) is an American former wrestler who competed in the 1988 Summer Olympics, for the United States.

Born in Eureka, South Dakota, Scherr also competed in the World Championships as a freestyle wrestler (85', 86, 87', and 89'), earning a gold medal in 1985 at the FILA Wrestling World Championships in Budapest. In college, Scherr wrestled at the University of Nebraska and won the 190 pound NCAA championship in 1984.

In 1998, Scherr was inducted into the National Wrestling Hall of Fame as a Distinguished Member.

Accomplishments
 Gold Medal – 1985 FILA World Championship 90 kg
 Silver Medal – 1986 FILA World Championship 100 kg
 Bronze Medal – 1987 FILA World Championship 100 kg
 Bronze Medal – 1988 Olympics Freestyle Wrestling 100 kg
 Silver Medal – 1989 FILA World Championship 100 kg
 1998 – National Wrestling Hall of Fame Distinguished Member

References

 
 

1961 births
Living people
Wrestlers at the 1988 Summer Olympics
American male sport wrestlers
Olympic bronze medalists for the United States in wrestling
People from Eureka, South Dakota
Sportspeople from South Dakota
World Wrestling Championships medalists
Medalists at the 1988 Summer Olympics
Pan American Games medalists in wrestling
Pan American Games gold medalists for the United States
Wrestlers at the 1987 Pan American Games